Berclair is an unincorporated community located in Leflore County, Mississippi, United States. It is part of the Greenwood, Mississippi micropolitan area.

History
Berclair is located along Blue Lake. In 1905, Berclair was home to the Schuh-Miller Lumber Company. In 1910, Berclair had five general stores, sawmill, and cotton gin. Berclair sits on the Columbus and Greenville Railway.

A post office operated under the name Berclair from 1890 to 1894 and from 1899 to 1920.

Notable person
Blues guitar player B.B. King was born just outside Berclair in 1925, and lived there until the age of four when he went to live with his maternal grandmother. This event is commemorated by a Mississippi Blues Trail marker in Berclair.

Gallery

References

Unincorporated communities in Leflore County, Mississippi
Unincorporated communities in Mississippi
Greenwood, Mississippi micropolitan area